KSSA (105.9 FM) La Ke Buena is a radio station broadcasting a Regional Mexican format. Licensed to Ingalls, Kansas, United States, the station is currently owned by Mark Yearout, through licensee Southwind Broadcasting, LLC.

History
The station was assigned the call letters KBIE on July 17, 1998. On December 12, 1998, the station changed its call sign to KSSA.

References

External links

Audio on line

SSA
Regional Mexican radio stations in the United States
Radio stations established in 1989
SSA